Sustainopreneurship (entrepreneurship and innovation for sustainability) is an idea that emerged from the earlier concepts of social entrepreneurship and ecopreneurship, via sustainability entrepreneurship. The concept aims to use creative business organization in order to solve problems related to sustainability. With social and environmental sustainability as a strategic objective and purpose, sustainopreneurship aims to respect the boundaries set in order to maintain the life support systems in the process. In other words, it is a "business with a cause" – where ideally the world problems are turned into business opportunities by deployment of sustainability innovations.

Definition

The definition first introduced in a conference article in 2006:

 Deployment of sustainability innovations: Entrepreneurship and innovation for sustainability. 
 Short for sustainability intra-/entrepreneurship. 
 To focus on one or more (world/social/sustainability-related) problem(s), find/identify and/or invent a solution to the problem(s) and bring the innovation to the market by creating an efficient organization. With the (new alt. deep transformation of an old) mission/cause-oriented sustainability business adding ecological/economical/social values and gains, with a bias towards the intangible – through dematerialization/resocialization. The value added at the same time preserving, restoring and/or ultimately enhancing the underlying utilized capital stock, in order to maintain the capacity to fulfil the needs of present and coming generations of stakeholders.

Conceptual development

The business has been nominated as a premier force for creating a sustainable world, especially when acting as a source of innovation and creativity – e. g. as Robinson (2004:378) puts it:

"In addition to integrating across fields, sustainability must also be integrated across sectors or interests. It is clear that governments alone have neither the will nor the capability to accomplish sustainability on their own. The private sector, as the chief engine of economic activity on the planet, and a major source for creativity, innovation and entrepreneurship, must be involved in trying to achieve sustainability." 

Sustainopreneurship is a candidate to be the accentuating factor to give even more leverage to forces emerging from world of business activities to contribute to sustainability. The concept of sustainopreneurship was first introduced as a term in 2000 where it was predominantly related to the proactive change management approaches associated with process adjustment with increased respect to the environment. The phenomenon developed with publications in 2003, and further evolved and was tentatively defined in 2006 by Anders Abrahamsson. This tentative definition was empirically tested in his Master thesis, where the enactive research process confirmed that the definition stood the test contrasting it towards the auto-ethnographical empirical material. A paper to identify future research challenges was made beyond this in 2007, and developed further with a book chapter published in September 2008.

In general, the entrepreneurial discourse has opened up to move beyond a strictly economic phenomenon, rather than being perceived primarily as a social process at large. Preceding the conceptual formation were two traces of social entrepreneurship and eco-preneurship, dealing primarily with the social and ecological dimensions of sustainability. Primary associations with social entrepreneurship have also been establishing not-for-profit venturing and charities to innovatively address and solve social problems, whereas ecopreneurship has been primarily focused on solving environmental problems. See Principles of ecopreneurship.

Both these traces of conceptual development are taken beyond, merge and integrate into the suggested conceptual construct at hand, where distinctions are made from both of these concepts – sustainopreneurial processes taking place institutionally through for-profit organizing, but not with profit as its main driving force. Sustainopreneurial venturing is done in a holistic manner that meets both ecological and social challenges simultaneously with regard to both purpose and process.

Three main dimensions 

The definition of sustainopreneurship needs to be highlighted by three distinguishing dimensions with all three being simultaneously present in the applied (inter)action it reflects. The first is oriented towards "why" – its purpose and motive. The second and third are reflecting two "how"-related dimensions – its process. 

1. Sustainopreneurship consciously sets out to find and/or create innovations to solve sustainability-related problems

The conscious mission that guides the action, especially in the nascent '-preneurial' stage before venturing forms and formalizes into an institutionalized business entity, is to deliberately find practical and innovative solutions to problems related to the sustainability agenda. This is the main key to distinguish this category of entrepreneurial activity and behaviour labelled sustainopreneurship from generic entrepreneurial activity: the cause-oriented intention that places the core motive, purpose and driving-force of the business activities. To identify and further grasp what is meant by sustainability problems, central sources in the global sustainable development discourse are identified, which guide us to what is meant practically and operationally by sustainability in action. The outcome of diverse sources are summarized in this list of "sustainability-related problems", determined by the political action plan documented in Agenda 21, the Millennium Declaration defining the Millennium Development Goals, both agreed at the Millennium Summit in New York 2000, and the WSSD Plan of Implementation decided upon at the World Summit on Sustainable Development in Johannesburg 2002. This list, derived and synthesized from these sources, lines up areas with associated problems to solve, goals to reach and values to create:

 Poverty
 Water and sanitation
 Health
 Education/illiteracy
 Sustainable production and consumption patterns
  Climate change and energy systems
 Chemicals
 Urbanization
 Ecosystems, biological diversity and land use
 Utilization of sea resources
 Food and agriculture
 Trade justice
 Social stability, democracy and good governance
 Peace and security

2. Sustainopreneurship means to get solutions to the market through creative organizing 

The line-up above could make one easily depressed. But, a fundamental attitude to acquire and maintain when this list of sustainability-related problems is compiled and then considered is to avoid falling into disempowerment and despair. It is of core importance to take the agenda as entrepreneurial challenges – to view problems as possibilities, obstacles as opportunities, and resistance as a resource, whatever the nature of the resistance. If the solution is generated by creativity, it is equally important to take it to the market in a creative and innovative way. In this dimension there is nothing that really differs from the generic entrepreneurial description I subscribe to, but this comes natural since sustainopreneurship is a conceptual extension and development from the social phenomenon named entrepreneurship, and thus inherits one of its perceived key dimensions, 'entrepreneurship as creative organizing'. The market is used as well, not society primarily, since it implies business establishment – a sustainability business that still knows its place and role in the holarchy mentioned earlier. Bringing something to the market at the same time brings it to society and our shared physical environment.

3. Sustainopreneurship in process adds sustainability value with respect for life support systems 

The awareness that the (economic) market is an embedded sub-system in the "socio-sphere" that is in turn a part of the 'bio-sphere' is made explicit. This awareness naturally and self-evidently makes the sustainopreneurial team maximize harmony with life support systems in the process. With joy and pride the epitome of the generic definition of "sustainable development" lives in business venturing. In short – living the generic definition of sustainable development as defined by WCED, with respect to the needs of present and future stakeholders, keeping the holistic world-view and making it guide everyday (inter)action. 

Sustainable vs. sustainability entrepreneurship
With these dimensions clarified and distinctions made a common conceptual vagueness or lack of clarity needs to be addressed, where a strong need to distinguish clearly between sustainable, vs. sustainability entrepreneurship is identified. From this point of view, a very important distinction with the concept formed is claimed – sustainability entrepreneurship as in the concept sustainopreneurship; the use of entrepreneurial activity in a determined action orientation towards solving a sustainability-related problem with (creative) business organizing as a means to solve the problem(s) – business with a cause: to turn business activity from a part of the problem to a part of the solution. Sustainable entrepreneurship is just a generic entrepreneurial process that takes into consideration the boundaries set by sustainability, and does not address where to and why, the destination, the purpose or the aim of the venture. The strategic intent and the business idea in itself are not related to sustainability per se, sustainability just being an "attachment" to the entrepreneurial process. The second and third dimensions are represented, but not the first. Sustainability'' entrepreneurship, in contrast, takes as its root of existence and strategic aim to solve a sustainability-related problem. This means that all three dimensions are simultaneously present: to take a sustainability innovation to the market through creative organizing with respect for life-supporting systems in the process.

Future development 

Given its recent date, there is a need for future research, as mentioned above. Main findings here are that conceptually, a deeper analysis is needed to be conducted with a nuanced and detailed taxonomy and framework created of sustainability innovations, the core of sustainopreneurship, primarily by cataloging and categorizing case stories. It is also needed to make a more detailed description to relate sustainopreneurship to other concepts in the wider, general idea-sphere of the "business case of sustainability", in the contemporary plethora of "buzz-words", approaches, methods and acronyms that already exists – and in this context also to motivate why this concept adds value. 

It has been recommended, though, to keep the research applied, to identify obstacles and institutional barriers, and how to overcome them; i. e. facilitating factors for sustainopreneurship, researching prospective tools, enablers and approaches. Appropriate areas and domains for sustainopreneurship applied are recommended to be digested. Research methods recommended are Enactive Research and Open Space Technology, since they add instant value among stakeholders, and in themselves naturally builds arenas where sustainopreneurship evolves and proliferates. For progress, beyond these "how"-related pointers, the key is to single out "the big questions", getting answers through collaborative, collective dialogue and conversation, with an explicit interaction and results orientation. Issues and topics have been formulated and outlined, where it is of striking importance with an intention to attract authentic forces potentially hearing this call of exploring the phenomenon further, with the purpose to collapse the degrees of separation in between the stakeholders of the sustainopreneurial concept – in idea, reflective practice and applied interaction to generate collective and collaborative wisdom for a deeper understanding of the concept. A key means to also get deeper understanding could be to digest further the conceptual spheres associated with 'institutional entrepreneurship', as in (consciously) challenging established order, by (co-)creating new institutions that both lies in the way of creating sustainability, as well as being there to support overall development(s) towards a Sustainable World.

See also

 Bottom of the pyramid
 Eco-innovation
 Entrepreneurship
 Environmental technology
 Innovation
 Principles of ecopreneurship
 Social business
 Social enterprise
 Social entrepreneurship
 Social innovation
 Sustainability
 Sustainable development

References

External links
 Google Scholar Search on Sustainopreneurship (academically approved research on the subject)
 Sustainopreneurship Research – Publications on Scribd

Social economy
Social entrepreneurship
Entrepreneurship
Business ethics